Mohammadabad-e Nil (also Romanized as Moḩammadābād-e Nīl; also known as Moḩammadābād and Nīl) is a village in Khosrowabad Rural District, Chang Almas District, Bijar County, Kurdistan Province, Iran. At the 2006 census, its population was 286, in 63 families. The village is populated by Kurds.

References 

Towns and villages in Bijar County
Kurdish settlements in Kurdistan Province